Rebecca Sabrina Morelle (born 8 December 1978) is a British science journalist, former BBC News global science correspondent and currently BBC News Science Editor.

Early life
She attended Goffs School (now Goffs Academy) in Cheshunt in Borough of Broxbourne, south-east Hertfordshire.

Career
Morelle graduated from Oxford University in July 2001, with a first class degree in chemistry, and then worked as senior press officer at the Science Media Centre.

In late 2005, Morelle was the first recipient of the Ivan Noble Bursary at BBC News.

References

External links
 

1978 births
BBC science journalists
English journalists
British reporters and correspondents
Alumni of St Anne's College, Oxford
People from Cheshunt
Living people